Stadion Miejski w Aleksandrowie Kujawskim, also known as Stadium in Aleksandrów Kujawski, is a sports arena in Aleksandrów Kujawski in Poland

Aleksandrów County
Sports venues in Kuyavian-Pomeranian Voivodeship